Balestra may refer to:

 Balestra (surname), a list of people
 Palazzo Muti or Balestra, a 1644 townhouse in Rome
 Balestra, an Italian Navy Ariete-class torpedo boat of World War II
 In fencing, a type of forward step, usually followed by a lunge
 Balestra Capital Management, a hedge fund manager founded by James Melcher
 A synonym for Grignolino, a variety of wine grape